Live: Sittin' in Again at Santa Barbara Bowl is a live compilation album (and eleventh overall release) by singer-songwriter duo Loggins and Messina, released in late 2005. It was recorded in Santa Barbara at one of the first performances of their reunion tour. The physical CD features thirteen tracks; however an online download-only version includes five additional tracks: "Sailin' the Wind", "Long Tail Cat", "Thinking of You", "Be Free", and "You Need a Man" which can also be heard (and seen) on the DVD release of the concert.

Track listing
"Watching the River Run" (Kenny Loggins, Jim Messina) – 3:54
"House at Pooh Corner" (Loggins) – 4:16
"Listen to a Country Song/Holiday Hotel" (Messina, Al Garth) – 4:44
"Back to Georgia" (Loggins) – 3:19
"Trilogy: Lovin' Me/To Make a Woman Feel Wanted/Peace of Mind" (Loggins, Messina, Murray MacLeod) – 14:45
"Your Mama Don't Dance" (Loggins, Messina) – 3:38
"A Love Song" (Loggins, Donna Lyn George) – 2:23
"Same Old Wine" (Messina) – 8:02
"Changes" (Messina) – 5:17
"Vahevala" (Loggins, Dann Lottermoser) – 7:06
"Angry Eyes" (Loggins, Messina) – 7:54
"Nobody But You" (Messina) – 4:30
"Danny's Song" (Loggins) – 2:41

DVD track listing
"Intro"
"Watching The River Run"
"House At Pooh Corner"
"Sailin' The Wind" (Loggins, Lottermoser)
"Long Tail Cat" (Loggins)
"Listen To A Country Song/Holiday Song"
"Changes"
"Back To Georgia"
"Trilogy: Lovin' Me/Make A Woman Feel Wanted/Peace of Mind"
"Your Mama Don't Dance"
"A Love Song"
"Thinking Of You" (Messina)
"Kind Woman" (Richie Furay)
"Be Free" (Messina)
"Same Old Wine"
"Growin'" (Loggins, Ronnie Wilkins)
"You Need A Man" (Messina)
"Vahevala"
"Angry Eyes"
"Nobody But You"
"Danny's Song"

Bonus tracks from The Midnight Special (1973)
"My Music" (Loggins, Messina)
"Danny's Song"
"Your Mama Don't Dance"
"You Need A Man"
"Coming To You" (Messina)
"Sailin' The Wind"

Personnel
Kenny Loggins – vocals, guitar
Jim Messina – vocals, guitar, mandolin
Steve DiStanislao – drums
Gabe Dixon – keyboards
Jeff Nathanson – saxophone, EWI
Steve Nieves – percussion, saxophone
Shem von Schroeck – bass guitar
Gabe Witcher – fiddle, dobro

Additional personnel on DVD bonus tracks 
 Merel Bregante – drums 
 Larry Sims – bass, backing vocals 
 Al Garth – reed instruments, violin, recorder 
 Jon Clarke – reed instruments

Production
Producers: Jim Messina, Kenny Loggins
Product manager: Mike Engstrom
Digital editing: Anthony Catalano
Engineer: Guy Charbonneau, Elliot Scheiner
Mastering: Darcy Proper
Photography: Larry Mills, Greg Waterman
Liner notes: Peter Fornatale

References 

Loggins and Messina albums
2005 live albums
2005 video albums
Live video albums
Rhino Records live albums
Rhino Records video albums
Albums produced by Kenny Loggins
Albums produced by Jim Messina (musician)